Geodia hirsuta is a species of sponge in the family Geodiidae. The species is found in the waters of Indonesia and was first described by Sollas in 1886 as Cydonium hirsutum.

References
 

Tetractinellida
Sponges described in 1886
Taxa named by William Johnson Sollas